"Replay" is a song performed by Georgian-Greek singer Tamta. The song title and artist were revealed on 21 December 2018 by the CyBC. The song was written by Alex P. A preview of the song was published on 24 February 2019. The song was performed during the first semi-final of the Eurovision Song Contest 2019 as the Cypriot entry and gained enough votes to qualify for the final, where it placed 13th with 109 points.

At Eurovision

Tel Aviv 

The song was chosen to represent Cyprus in the Eurovision Song Contest 2019 after Tamta was internally selected by the Cypriot broadcaster. On 28 January 2019, a special allocation draw was held which placed each country into one of the two semi-finals, as well as which half of the show they would perform in. Cyprus was placed into the first semi-final, to be held on 14 May 2019, and was scheduled to perform in the first half of the show. Once all the competing songs for the 2019 contest had been released, the running order for the semi-finals was decided by the show's producers rather than through another draw, so that similar songs were not placed next to each other. Cyprus performed first, and gained enough votes to qualify for the final. It finished in 13th with 109 points.

Track listing 

Digital download
"Replay" – 2:53

Charts

Release history

References 

2019 singles
2019 songs
Eurovision songs of Cyprus
Eurovision songs of 2019
Songs written by Alex P
Songs written by Kristoffer Fogelmark
Songs written by Geraldo Sandell
Songs written by Albin Nedler